The 1906 Kentucky State College Blue and White football team represented Kentucky State College—now known as the University of Kentucky—as an independent during the 1906 college football season. Led by first-year head coach J. White Guyn, the Blue and White compiled a record of 4–3.

Schedule

References

Kentucky State College
Kentucky Wildcats football seasons
Kentucky State College Blue and White football